FPI may refer to:

Government and politics 
 Federal Prison Industries, a US government corporation which employs prison labor
 Foreign Policy Initiative, an American think tank
 Foreign Policy Institute, a Turkish think tank
 The Foreign Policy Institute, a research institute at Johns Hopkins University
 Islam Defenders Front, an indonesian political organization
 Ivorian Popular Front
 The Service for Foreign Policy Instruments, a service of the European Commission

Science, engineering and mathematics 
 Fabry–Pérot interferometer
 Fast probability integration, a method used in reliability engineering
 Fixed-point iteration
 Fluorescent penetrant inspection
 Formal Public Identifier
 Freiburger Persönlichkeitsinventar, a psychological personality test

Other uses 
 Family and Parenting Institute
 Faridpur Polytechnic Institute
 Football Power Index
 Force Protection Inc, an American military vehicle manufacturer
 Foreign portfolio investment
 Free Press of India
 Frunze Polytechnic Institute, now Kyrgyz Technical University